Elections to Watford Borough Council were held on 3 May 2007. One third of the council was up for election and the Liberal Democrat party kept overall control of the council.

After the election, the composition of the council was:
Liberal Democrat 28
Green 3
Conservative 3
Labour 2

Council election result

Ward results

References
2007 Watford election result
Election Results – Borough 3 May 2007
County Council Election 2007: Watford Borough Elections
Mayor: We could topple Claire

2007 English local elections
2007
2000s in Hertfordshire